Johann Leonhard Rost (14 August 1688 – 22 March 1727) was a German astronomer and author from Nuremberg. He wrote under the alias Meletaon.

The crater Rost on the Moon is named after him.

His brother Johannes Carolus Rost was a famous doctor from Nuremberg, he is mostly known to be the personal doctor of Anna Maria Franziska of Saxe-Lauenburg.

Bibliography
 Meletaon, "Schau-Platz der gelährten und galanten Welt", 1711.
 Meletaon, "Die Unglückseelige Atalanta", 1717.
 Rost, J. L., "Atlas Portatilis Coelestis", 1723.

External links
 Atlas Portatilis Coelestis, 1723 - Full digital facsimile, Linda Hall Library.
 Biography & Bibliography by Hans Gaab and Olaf Simons

1688 births
1727 deaths
18th-century German astronomers
Members of the Prussian Academy of Sciences
Scientists from Nuremberg
University of Altdorf alumni
Leipzig University alumni